Pimpri railway station or Pimpri station is a railway station in the Pimpri area. It is located near the Pimpri vegetable market. This station is on Mumbai– main line. This station has two platforms and two footbridges. All suburban trains halt at Pimpri station. Two express trains i.e., Sinhagad Express and Sahyadri Express halt at this station. The passenger trains traveling from Mumbai to Bijapur/Pandharpur/Shirdi also halt here and also Pune–Karjat passenger halts here.

The station also houses a State Bank of India (SBI) ATM Centre located near the ticket counter. Pimpri Colony Post Office (Pin Code 411017) is situated just outside the railway station, about half a minute's walk from the ticket counter.

Trains

Down trains

Up trains

Suburban trains

External links
 Current train status for Pimpri station
 Pimpri station train timmings
 Lonavala–Pune Suburban Trains
 Pune–Lonavala Suburban Trains

Pune
Transport in Pimpri-Chinchwad
Pune Suburban Railway
Pune railway division
Buildings and structures in Pimpri-Chinchwad